is the first full-length album by Japanese novelty heavy metal band Animetal, released through Sony Records on March 21, 1997. The album consists of a non-stop marathon of metal covers of anime themes from the 1960s, 1970s, and 1980s. A karaoke version of this album was also released on April 21, 1997. This is also the only studio album to feature the band as a quartet; all other releases have the band as a trio with a guest drummer.

"Gatchaman no Uta," "Combattler V no Theme," "Yūsha Raideen," "Tatakae! Casshan," "Mazinger Z," "Getter Robo" and "Devilman no Uta" were previously recorded as a six-minute marathon and independently released as the band's self-titled 1996 EP. "Uchū Senkan Yamato," "Umi no Triton," "Great Mazinger," "Tatakae! Polymar," "Tiger Mask," "Babel II" and "Taga Tame ni (Cyborg 009 theme)" were recorded as a separate marathon titled This is Animetal. Majority of this album was mixed with tracks from This is Animetal, Tokusatsu de Ikou!, Animetal Summer, Animetal Lady Sanjo!, Animetal Lady Kenzan and Animetal Lady Marathon and released internationally as This Is Japanimetal Marathon.

Some songs in the marathon incorporate guitar riffs from classic hard rock and heavy metal songs. For instance, "Suki da Danguard Ace" uses the intro riff of Led Zeppelin's "Communication Breakdown."

The album cover's unnamed skeleton mascot is a parody of Iron Maiden's Eddie and Megadeth's Vic Rattlehead. He also appears on Animetal's albums and singles released by Sony Records. A female counterpart is used on Animetal Lady Marathon and its associated singles.

Track listing
All tracks are arranged by Animetal.

Personnel
 - Lead vocals
 - Guitar
Masaki - Bass
 - Drums

Footnotes

References

External links

1997 debut albums
Animetal albums
Japanese-language albums
Covers albums
Sony Music Entertainment Japan albums